Maarten Meiners (born 8 February 1992) is a Dutch alpine ski racer.

He competed at the 2015 World Championships in Beaver Creek, USA, in the giant slalom.

World Cup results

Results per discipline

Standings through 21 March 2021

World Championship results

Winter Universiade results

Other results

European Cup results

Season standings

Results per discipline

Standings through 15 February 2019

Far East Cup results

Season standings

Results per discipline

Standings through 13 December 2018

South American Cup results

Season standings

Results per discipline

Standings through 12 September 2018

References

External links
 Official home page

1992 births
Living people
Dutch male alpine skiers
Sportspeople from Amersfoort
Universiade medalists in alpine skiing
Universiade silver medalists for the Netherlands
Competitors at the 2017 Winter Universiade
Alpine skiers at the 2022 Winter Olympics
Olympic alpine skiers of the Netherlands
20th-century Dutch people
21st-century Dutch people